Denis Austin Dowd (1 January 1906 – 1 November 1963) was an Australian rules footballer who played with Fitzroy, South Melbourne and North Melbourne in the Victorian Football League (VFL).

Dowd played with a number of club's across Victoria including - Iona, Ballarat, Nhill and Nar Nar Goon prior to playing with Fitzroy.

Dowd was recruited to Fitzroy after being best on ground for Nar Nar Goon in the 1930 Central Gippsland Football League grand final.  

Dowd won the 1934 Central Gippsland FL best and fairest award. 

He later became President of the Corowa Football Club in the Ovens & Murray Football League in 1951.

Notes

External links 

1906 births
1963 deaths
Australian rules footballers from Victoria (Australia)
Fitzroy Football Club players
Sydney Swans players
North Melbourne Football Club players